The Porte taillée (French for carved gate) is a city gate located in Besançon (France). It was drilled in the rock of Saint-Étienne hill by the Romans under Vespasian or Marcus Aurelius, for the aqueduc of Besançon between Vaire-Arcier and square Castan. The passage is redeveloping during the Middle Ages in real city gate, and fortified in 1546 by Vauban under Charles Quint. The Porte taillée is classified Monument historique since 1944.

Gallery

References 

Buildings and structures in Besançon
City gates
Roman sites in France
Monuments historiques of Bourgogne-Franche-Comté
Road tunnels in France